Julie Cloutier (born April 24, 1986) is a Canadian fencer. She competed in the individual and team sabre events at the 2008 Summer Olympics. She was a member of the Canadian team that finished in 7th place in the team sabre event. She was born in Montreal, Quebec.

References

External links
 Profile on Fencing Canada official website

1986 births
Living people
Canadian female fencers
Olympic fencers of Canada
Fencers at the 2007 Pan American Games
Fencers at the 2008 Summer Olympics
Fencers from Montreal
French Quebecers
Pan American Games bronze medalists for Canada
Pan American Games medalists in fencing
Medalists at the 2007 Pan American Games